The Best American Short Stories yearly anthology is a part of The Best American Series published by Houghton Mifflin Harcourt.  Since 1915, the BASS anthology has striven to contain the best short stories by some of the best-known writers in contemporary American literature.

Edward O'Brien

The series began in 1915, when Edward O'Brien edited his selection of the previous year's stories. This first edition was serialized in a magazine; however, it caught the attention of the publishing company Small, Maynard & Company, which published subsequent editions until 1926, when the title was transferred to Dodd, Mead and Company.

The time appeared to be a propitious one for such a collection. The most popular magazines of the day featured short fiction prominently and frequently; the best authors were well-known and well-paid. More importantly, there was a nascent movement toward higher standards and greater experimentation among certain American writers. O'Brien capitalized on this moment. He was deeply and vocally skeptical of the value of commercial short fiction, which tended to the formulaic and sentimental; he insisted, in introduction after introduction, on the need for a consciously literary development of the short story. He used his selections to reinforce this call. Over the years of his editorship, he drew attention to two generations of American authors, from Sherwood Anderson and Edna Ferber to Richard Wright and Irwin Shaw. Perhaps the most significant instance of O'Brien's instincts involves Ernest Hemingway; O'Brien published that author's "My Old Man" when it had not even been published yet, and was, moreover, instrumental in finding an American publisher for In Our Time. O'Brien was known to work indefatigably: he claimed to read around 8,000 stories a year, and his editions contained lengthy tabulations of stories and magazines, ranked on a scale of three stars (representing O'Brien's notion of their "literary permanence.")

Though the series attained a degree of fame and popularity, it was never universally accepted. Fans of the period's popular fiction often found his selections precious or willfully obscure. On the other hand, many critics who accepted "literary" fiction objected to O'Brien's occasionally strident and pedantic tone. After his death, for instance, The New Yorker compared him to the recently deceased editor of the Social Register, suggesting that they shared a form of snobbery.

Martha Foley

O'Brien died of a heart attack in London in 1941. He was replaced as editor of the series by Martha Foley, founder and former editor of Story magazine. O'Brien, who had once called Story one of the most important events in literary history since the publication of Lyrical Ballads, presumably would have approved the choice. Foley edited the publication, at first alone and then with the assistance of her son, David Burnett, until 1977. These years witnessed both the ascendancy and eclipse of the type of short story  favored by O'Brien: writers as diverse as John Cheever, Bernard Malamud, Joyce Carol Oates, and Tillie Olsen offered sharply observed, generally realistic stories that eschewed trite conventions. At the same time, Foley evinced some degree of awareness of the new currents in fiction. Donald Barthelme, for instance, was chosen for The School in 1976. Foley also attended to the rise of so-called minority literature, dedicating the 1975 volume to Leslie Marmon Silko, although it has been argued that the series was less perceptive in this area than it might have been.

Since 1978

After Foley's death, the publisher—by that time, Houghton Mifflin—elected to take the series in a new direction. Under the guidance of a series editor (Shannon Ravenel 1978-1990, Katrina Kenison 1991-2006, Heidi Pitlor 2007- ), a different writer of reputation would select the contents and introduce the volume each year. The editor would choose the best twenty stories from 120 stories recommended by the series editor. This format has been followed since, although the guest editor has occasionally gone beyond what the series editor recommended (e.g., John Gardner in 1982).

In 2002, Houghton-Mifflin made the series part of its broader Best American series.

Guest editors of the BASS anthology from 1978 to 1989:

1978: Ted Solotaroff
1979: Joyce Carol Oates
1980: Stanley Elkin
1981: Hortense Calisher
1982: John Gardner
1983: Anne Tyler
1984: John Updike
1985: Gail Godwin
1986: Raymond Carver
1987: Ann Beattie
1988: Mark Helprin
1989: Margaret Atwood

Guest editors of the BASS anthology from 1990 to 1999:

1990: Richard Ford
1991: Alice Adams
1992: Robert Stone
1993: Louise Erdrich
1994: Tobias Wolff
1995: Jane Smiley
1996: John Edgar Wideman
1997: Annie Proulx
1998: Garrison Keillor
1999: Amy Tan

Guest editors of the BASS anthology from 2000 to 2009:

2000: E. L. Doctorow
2001: Barbara Kingsolver
2002: Sue Miller
2003: Walter Mosley
2004: Lorrie Moore
2005: Michael Chabon
2006: Ann Patchett
2007: Stephen King
2008: Salman Rushdie
2009: Alice Sebold

Guest editors of the BASS anthology from 2010 to 2019:

2010: Richard Russo
2011: Geraldine Brooks
2012: Tom Perrotta
2013: Elizabeth Strout
2014: Jennifer Egan
2015: T. C. Boyle
2016: Junot Díaz
2017: Meg Wolitzer
2018: Roxane Gay
2019: Anthony Doerr

Guest editors of the BASS anthology since 2020:

2020: Curtis Sittenfeld
2021: Jesmyn Ward
2022: Andrew Sean Greer

The Best American Short Stories of the Century; 100 Years of The Best American Short Stories
In 2000, John Updike selected twenty-two unabridged stories from the first eighty-four annual volumes of The Best American Short Stories, and the result is The Best American Short Stories of the Century. The expanded CD audio edition includes a new story from The Best American Short Stories 1999 to round out the century.
In 2015, Lorrie Moore served as the guest editor for a centennial anthology from the series, 100 Years of The Best American Short Stories.

See also
O. Henry Award
The Best American Short Stories 1986
The Best American Short Stories 1987
The Best American Short Stories 1988
The Best American Short Stories 1989
The Best American Short Stories 1990
The Best American Short Stories 1991
The Best American Short Stories 1992
The Best American Short Stories 1993 
The Best American Short Stories 1994 
The Best American Short Stories 1995
The Best American Short Stories 1996
The Best American Short Stories 1997
The Best American Short Stories 1998
The Best American Short Stories 1999
The Best American Short Stories 2000
The Best American Short Stories 2001
The Best American Short Stories 2002
The Best American Short Stories 2003
The Best American Short Stories 2004
The Best American Short Stories 2005
The Best American Short Stories 2006
The Best American Short Stories 2007
The Best American Short Stories 2008
The Best American Short Stories 2009
The Best American Short Stories 2010
The Best American Short Stories 2011
The Best American Short Stories 2012
The Best American Short Stories 2013
The Best American Short Stories 2014
The Best American Short Stories 2015
The Best American Short Stories 2016
The Best American Short Stories 2017
The Best American Short Stories 2018
The Best American Short Stories 2019
The Best American Short Stories 2020
The Best American Short Stories 2021
The Best American Short Stories 2022

References

Carlos Baker (1969). Ernest Hemingway: A Life. New York: Scribner's.
Jacquelyn Spangler (1997). Edward J. O'Brien: Best Short Stories and the Production of an American Genre. Unpublished dissertation, 1997.
William Wilson (1981). "Review of 'The Story of Story'". American Literature 53 (1981): 151-2.
Aaron Sommers (2010). "Short Stories: An Experiment in Misery."

External links
Official
The Best American Series, on the Houghton Mifflin Website
Sources
The Best American Short Stories (1915-1921) at Internet Archive (scanned books original editions color illustrated)
 (plain text and HTML)

Other
Years of BASS, a year spent reading back issues of BASS 1978-2009. Includes spreadsheet of all stories and authors. Additional information including original publications where the stories first appeared.

 
Book series introduced in 1915
Fiction anthologies
Short Stories
Houghton Mifflin books
Publications established in 1915
Anthology series